Delmar is a hamlet in the Town of Bethlehem, in Albany County, New York, United States. It is a suburb of the neighboring city of Albany. The community is bisected by NY Route 443 (Delaware Avenue), a major thoroughfare, main street, and route to Albany.

A census-designated place (CDP) has been established since 1980 by the U.S. Census Bureau for tabulating the population of what the census has defined as the boundaries of the urbanized area in and around Delmar. The population was 8,292 at the 2000 census, but it was not included as a CDP in the 2010 census.

In 2005, CNN/Money Magazine named the Delmar ZIP Code (an area larger than the Delmar hamlet or CDP) as one of the "Best Places to Live" in America, rating it the 22nd best place to live among what it called "Great American Towns."

History

Nathaniel Adams moved to the area in 1836 and, two years later, built a large hotel and made other improvements. When the first post office was built in 1840, he became the first post master. The Adams Hotel was Bethlehem's Town Hall from 1950-1980. In 1841, Nathaniel donated an acre of land for a chapel to be built so that those of the Dutch Reformed Church did not have to travel to Unionville to attend worship though this new church continued to be under the Union Reformed Church. In 1847, the members of the Reformed Church at Adams Station petitioned for their own organization separate from Union, and in 1848 this was granted by both the Union Reformed Church and the Classis of Albany. For Nathaniel Adams, Delmar received its early name of Adamsville.

After Adamsville received its post office, mail began to get confused with the town of Adams, New York, which also had an Adams Village. The name of the post office was changed to Adams Station in an attempt to relieve that confusion. The Albany and Susquehanna Railroad, which had a station on Adams Street north of Kenwood Avenue, however, had chosen to change from Adamsville to Delmar. In 1892, a petition by area residents to change the post office to match Delmar was accepted.

The Patterson Farmhouse, United States Post Office, and Van Derheyden House are listed on the National Register of Historic Places.

Geography
As a hamlet, the borders of Delmar are indeterminate, though generally the unincorporated village is considered to be centered on the intersection of Kenwood and Delaware avenues. A CDP's borders can, however, change from census to census. As of 2000, the border followed the Normans Kill to the north, and then for the western border it travels south on McCormack Road North to Cherry Ave Extension (New York Route 140) where it turns left and then right on to McCormack Road. At Bridge Avenue, in the neighboring hamlet of Slingerlands, the CDP's border turns left, and then right onto Albany County Route 52 (Cherry Ave/Elm Ave). The border then turns east (left) onto the Delmar Bypass (New York Route 32) to Elsmere Avenue (New York Route 335), where it then travels north. At the intersection of Elsmere Ave with Delaware Avenue, the border turns east onto the latter. At Salisbury Road, the Delmar CDP border carves a small enclave by turning left onto said road and then right onto Normanside Avenue, then by turning onto Euclid Avenue it travels back southeast to Delaware Avenue once again. After another small jog on Delaware Ave, the border turns left for Normanskill Boulevard opposite the Delaware Plaza. After turning right onto Bethlehem Court, the border then travels in a straight northeastern line to intersect again at the Normanskill.

Several small creeks and streams flow through Delmar; generally north of Delaware Avenue they flow north to the Normans Kill; south of Delaware Avenue is Dowers Kill which is a south-flowing tributary of the Vloman Kill.

Location

Demographics

As of the census of 2000, there were 8,292 people, 3,420 households, and 2,373 families residing in the CDP. The population density was 1,892.4 per square mile (730.9/km2). There were 3,501 housing units at an average density of 799.0/sq mi (308.6/km2). The racial makeup of the CDP was 96.61% White, 1.24% Asian, 1.18% African American, 0.12% Native American,  0.01% Pacific Islander, 0.25% from other races, and 0.58% from two or more races. 1.23% of the population were Hispanic or Latino of any race.

There were 3,420 households, out of which 33.3% had children under the age of 18 living with them, 60.0% were married couples living together, 7.4% had a female householder with no husband present, and 30.6% were non-families. 26.7% of all households were made up of individuals, and 12.7% had someone living alone who was 65 years of age or older. The average household size was 2.41 and the average family size was 2.94.

In the CDP, the population was spread out, with 25.4% under the age of 18, 4.5% from 18 to 24, 24.3% from 25 to 44, 28.9% from 45 to 64, and 16.9% who were 65 years of age or older. The median age was 43 years. For every 100 females, there were 90.4 males. For every 100 females age 18 and over, there were 84.9 males.

The median income for a household in the CDP was $64,438, and the median income for a family was $83,219. Males had a median income of $57,038 versus $37,133 for females. The per capita income for the CDP was $35,363. 2.4% of the population and 1.7% of families were below the poverty line. Out of the total population, 3.0% of those under the age of 18 and 0.8% of those 65 and older were living below the poverty line.

Notable people
 Edward Burton Hughes (1905-6 June 1987) Acting Commissioner of New York State Department of Transportation 1969, Executive Deputy Commissioner of New York State Department of Transportation 1967-1970, and Deputy Superintendent of New York State Department of Public Works from 1952-1967. Hughes was a longtime resident of Delmar, New York, where he lived for around 40 years.
Megyn Kelly, American journalist and media personality.
Christopher Porco, convicted of the attempted murder of his mother and murder of his father, was born in this town.
Eva Marie Saint, film actress, was mostly raised in Delmar.

References

Hamlets in New York (state)
Bethlehem, New York
Hamlets in Albany County, New York
Former census-designated places in New York (state)